Felbinac (INN, or biphenylylacetic acid) is a topical medicine, belonging to the family of medicines known as nonsteroidal anti-inflammatory drugs (NSAIDs) of the arylacetic acid (not arylpropionic acid) class, which is used to treat muscle inflammation and arthritis. It is an active metabolite of fenbufen.

Related compounds
The α-methyl acid of felbinac is called biprofen and is used to prepare bifepramide.  The α-ethyl acid is called xenbucin which is used to make xenthiorate.

See also
Fluenetil

References 

Nonsteroidal anti-inflammatory drugs